David R. Clarke is a material scientist and the inaugural Extended Tarr Family Professor of Material Science and Applied Physics at Harvard John A. Paulson School of Engineering and Applied Sciences (SEAS). He is the principal investigator of the Materials Discovery and Applications Group.

Clarke was elected a member of the National Academy of Engineering in 1999 for research on the role of grain boundary phases and their importance to the engineering of technical ceramics.

Education and career 
Clarke received his bachelor's degree in applied science from the University of Sussex, England in 1968 and joined the National Physical Laboratory (NPL) as a scientific officer. He completed his doctoral degree in 1974, from the Cavendish Laboratory, University of Cambridge and rejoined NPL to work on fiber composites. Subsequently, he moved to the US and the University of California, Berkeley as a lecturer. Afterwards, he held various positions at prestigious institutions such as Rockwell International Science Center, Massachusetts Institute of Technology (MIT) and IBM Research Division, where he became senior manager of materials. In 1990, he was appointed as Professor of Materials and Professor of Mechanical Engineering at University of California, Santa Barbara (UCSB). He served as the department chair at Materials Department, UCSB from 1991 to 1998. In 2009, Clarke was appointed as Gordon McKay Professor of Materials and Applied Physics at Harvard University. From 2013, he has been the inaugural holder of the position of Extended Tarr Family Chair of Materials and Applied Physics at Harvard University.

Research and teaching interests 
Clarke is best known for his work in ceramics, thermal barrier coatings, high temperature materials and, now, dielectric elastomer actuators. Amongst his best known works are the discovery of nanometer thick wetting films in ceramics, the explanation for their existence, and their consequences on high-temperature properties; the development of photostimulated luminescence spectroscopy (PSLS) for non-contact measurement of stresses in aluminum oxide, and thermally grown oxides; his extensive studies of varistor surge protectors; and the discovery of a wide range of low thermal conductivity ceramics. He has authored more than 500 archival papers that have been cited more than 31,000 times. His research mainly focuses on fundamentals, properties and applications of materials including ceramics, metals, semiconductors, polymers and thermoelectrics. Clarke is a member of the National Academy of Engineering, a Fellow of both the American Physical Society and the American Ceramic Society, and a recipient of Alexander von Humboldt Foundation Senior Scientist Award. He was listed as an author of one of the 11 best papers in the 110 years of publications on ceramics and glasses. He serves as an Editor for the Annual Review of Materials Research and is Associate Editor for Journal of the American Ceramic Society.  He has over a dozen patents to his name. 
Over the years he has taught a variety of undergraduate and graduate level courses in materials, ranging from introductory classes to courses in phase equilibria, optical materials, phase transformations, thermodynamics and composites. He currently teaches seminars on “Glass” and  “Materials, Energy and Society” at the undergraduate Freshman level, and the required course on “Fundamentals of Heat Transfer” course for students studying Mechanical Engineering at Harvard University.

Awards and honors 
James Mueller Award, Engineering Ceramics Division, American Ceramic Society, 2014
Distinguished Life Member of the American Ceramic Society (ACS), 2009
Author of one of the 11 most significant papers in the 110 years of publication on ceramics and glasses, listed by the American Ceramic Society.
New Materials Award, 2008, from the National Institute of Materials Science (Japan), (jointly with A. G. Evans and C. G. Levi, UCSB).
Edward C. Henry Award, Electronics Division, American Ceramic Society, 1999
Sosman Memorial Award, American Ceramic Society, 1999
Van Horn Lectureship, Case Western Reserve University, 1999
Elected to the National Academy of Engineering in 1999
Morrison Lectureship, Brockhouse Institute, McMaster University, 1998
Academician, International Academy of Ceramics, 1995
Alexander von Humboldt Foundation Senior Scientist Award, 1992
Richard M. Fulrath Pacific Memorial Award, 1989
Fellow of the American Physical Society, 1986
Fellow of the American Ceramic Society, 1985
The Ross Coffin Purdy Award of the American Ceramic Society, 1982

References 

American materials scientists
Year of birth missing (living people)
Living people
John A. Paulson School of Engineering and Applied Sciences faculty
Alumni of the University of Sussex
Alumni of the University of Cambridge
University of California, Santa Barbara alumni
Fellows of the American Physical Society
Members of the United States National Academy of Engineering
Fellows of the American Ceramic Society
Annual Reviews (publisher) editors